, also known as Thunderbolt Fantasy: Sword Seekers, is a Japanese-Taiwanese glove puppetry television series created and written by Gen Urobuchi and produced as a collaboration between Japanese companies Nitroplus and Good Smile Company and Taiwanese puppet production company Pili International Multimedia, creators of Pili ("Thunderbolt") series. The series began airing in Japan starting July 8, 2016 and is being simulcast by Bahamut and iQiyi Taiwan in Taiwan, bilibili in Mainland China, and Crunchyroll in the United States. It has two official languages: the Taiwanese Min-Nan version aired in Taiwan, and the Japanese version aired outside Taiwan. A manga adaptation illustrated by Yui Sakuma began serialization in Kodansha's Weekly Morning magazine on July 21, 2016. A second adaption, told from the perspective of Dān Fěi, and illustrated by Kairi Shimotsuki, began serialization in Akita Shoten's Champion Cross online magazine on September 27, 2016. A side novel that focuses on the pasts of Lǐn Xuě Yā, Xíng Hài, and Shā Wú Shēng was released on April 7, 2017. A second season aired in 2018. A third season aired in 2021.

Plot
Set in an Eastern fantasy setting, Dān Fěi and her brother, guardians of a sword known as the Tiān Xíng Jiàn, are pursued by the evil Xuán Guǐ Zōng clan, who seek to obtain the sword for their master, Miè Tiān Hái. While her brother is defeated, Fěi, who possesses the sword's crossguard, escapes and finds herself in the care of the wandering swordsman, Shāng Bù Huàn, and a mysterious man named Lǐn Xuě Yā, who become her protectors from the pursuing Xuán Guǐ Zōng clan.

Characters
※ Character names are presented in the format of Chinese Personal Name (Chinese Characters, Japanese Romanization, English Translation) / Chinese Art name (Chinese Characters, Japanese Romanization, English Translation). Chinese personal names and their Japanese romanizations are presented with the character's surname appearing first, followed by their given name.

Main characters
 
Principal Puppeteer: Jia-Chang Hong, Substitute Puppeteer: Jia-Shen Liao
 (JP), Huei-Fung Huang (Taiwanese Min-Nan)
The main protagonist of this series, Shāng Bù Huàn is an enigmatic wandering swordsman. He appears to be cynical towards others, but is compassionate at heart. His inadvertent encounter with Lǐn Xuě Yā had him engulfed within the feud of the Xuán Guǐ Zōng pursuing Dān Fěi's crossguard of the Tiān Xíng Jiàn, and reluctantly joins the journey with Lǐn Xuě Yā and Dān Fěi to retrieve the hilt of the Tiān Xíng Jiàn. Hails from Xī Yōu.

  
Principal Puppeteer: Shen-En Wu
 (JP), Huei-Fung Huang (Min-Nan)
Lǐn Xuě Yā is a beautiful young man filled with immense mystery. Erudite and adept at the art of strategy, he is shown to be graceful and composed. According to Shòu Yún Xiāo, Lǐn Xuě Yā has used several aliases to conceal his identity. He is considered a master manipulator and thief, and has even been called a villain.

Season 1

Allies

Principal Puppeteer: Jia-Shen Liao
 (JP), Wei-De Deng (Min-Nan)
One of the Seal Guardians hailing from the Sword Forging Shrine in charge of guarding the Tiān Xíng Jiàn. Dān Fěi takes pride in her heritage as a Seal Guardian, which makes her quite stubborn and tense when it comes to issues regarding the Tiān Xíng Jiàn, but she's also shown to be fairly naïve due to being inexperienced with the world outside of her shrine.

 (JP), Huei-Fung Huang (Min-Nan)
 The elder brother of Dān Fěi, he is also a Seal Guardian who guards the Tiān Xíng Jiàn along with his sister. Dān Héng is responsible for guarding the hilt of the Tiān Xíng Jiàn, while Dān Fěi protects the crossguard of the sword. Dān Héng lost his life at the hands of Miè Tiān Hái when the Xuán Guǐ Zōng invaded their shrine.

 
 (JP), Huei-Fung Huang (Min-Nan)
 An old acquaintance of Lǐn Xuě Yā, Shòu Yún Xiāo is an archer who made a name for himself for his exceptional marksmanship. He regards Juǎn Cán Yún as his sworn younger brother. He joins the quest of retrieving the hilt of the Tiān Xíng Jiàn at Lǐn Xuě Yā's request.

 
 (JP), Huei-Fung Huang (Min-Nan)
 The sworn brother of Shòu Yún Xiāo, and a skilled spear wielder. Juǎn Cán Yún looks up to Shòu Yún Xiāo with admiration, and works hard to attain a reputation for himself using his skills. He tagged along with Yún Xiāo on the quest to retrieve the hilt of the Tiān Xíng Jiàn.

 
Principal Puppeteer: Jia-Shen Liao
 (JP), Hsin-Ya Kuo (Min-Nan)
 A powerful necromancer who dwells in the Night Devil Forest, and someone Lǐn Xuě Yā wishes to recruit to best the first obstacle of the Demon Spine Mountains. The other party members are wary of her because she is a demon, but Lǐn Xuě Yā assures them she can be trusted. However, Xíng Hài is shown to be hostile towards Lǐn Xuě Yā for unknown reasons.

 
 (JP), Huei-Fung Huang (Min-Nan)
 A notorious and heartless killer, but also a swordsman whose skills are unparalleled. Due to some old enmity, he has set his eye on Lǐn Xuě Yā for revenge, and is obsessed with chasing Lǐn Xuě Yā down. When faced with a strong opponent, he cannot help but step forward in challenge. Thinks very highly of himself. Died after challenging Miè Tiān Hái to a duel.

 (JP), Huei-Fung Huang (Min-Nan)
 The mentor of Lǐn Xuě Yā; the original owner of the Soul Echo Flute, he also taught Lǐn Xuě Yā how to create magic items. Died by the blade of Shā Wú Shēng, who then took the Soul Echo Flute.

Antagonists
 
Principal Puppeteer: Jia-Shen Liao
 (JP), Huei-Fung Huang (Min-Nan)
Leader of the Xuán Guǐ Zōng, a group which utilizes the naturally defended mountain fortress, Seven Sins Tower, as its base of operations. He is arrogant and prideful, due to his skill with the sword, and possesses necromantic powers. He is also the foremost antagonist of the story. In order to seize the Tiān Xíng Jiàn protected by the Dān siblings, he uses every means possible to invade the Dān Family's sacred grounds.

Principal Puppeteer: Jia-Shen Liao
 (JP), Huei-Fung Huang (Min-Nan)
Subordinate of Miè Tiān Hái. A Xuán Guǐ Zōng swordsman ordered to hunt down Dān Fěi. Died after confusing Shāng Bù Huàn with Dān Fěi due to the machinations of Lǐn Xuě Yā.
 

Principal Puppeteer: Shen-En Wu
 (JP), Hsin-Ya Kuo (Min-Nan)
Subordinate of Miè Tiān Hái. Ambushed Shāng Bù Huàn after he helped Dān Fěi escape, but was driven off by Shòu Yún Xiāo. Died after attacking Shā Wú Shēng.

 (JP), Huei-Fung Huang (Min-Nan)
Subordinate of Miè Tiān Hái. Killed by Shāng Bù Huàn after trying to capture him along with Dān Fěi and Juǎn Cán Yún.

Season 2

Allies
 / 
 (JP)
 First appearing in Thunderbolt Fantasy: The Sword of Life and Death, he is a mysterious, red-haired, young man who carries a demonic talking Pipa named Líng Yá (voiced by Katsuyuki Konishi). He returns in Season 2 following his old acquaintance, Shāng Bù Huàn, after the latter left him in Xī Yōu. Làng was originally designed as a mascot for T.M. Revolution to promote the franchise, but Urobuchi grew fond of the character and later incorporated him in the franchise's main story. Làng Wū Yáo is the main character in the prequel movie Thunderbolt Fantasy - Bewitching Melody of the West.

Antagonists
 / 
Voiced by: Tarusuke Shingaki (JP), Huei-Fung Huang (Min-Nan)
A magistrate of Xī Yōu, he is tasked in finding Shāng Bù Huàn and retrieving the Sorcerous Sword Index. He is a cruel and cunning man who uses "justice" as a pretense to do villainous things.

 / 
Voiced by: Ayahi Takagaki (JP)
An assassin sent to hunt down Shāng Bù Huàn and retrieve the Sorcerous Sword Index, she is a master of deception, dark magic and poisoning.

Voiced by: Shō Hayami (JP)
Xiē Yīng Luò's master, he is the leader of the Order of The Divine Swarm, an evil organization seeking the Sorcerous Sword Index. He is an incredibly powerful wizard that is skilled in dark magic.

 
Voiced by: Akira Ishida (JP), Huang Zhen-Ji (Min-Nan)
A nihilistic monk on a pilgrimage. When he encounters Xiē Yīng Luò, who threatens him with death, he questions her true motivations and goes as far as saving her from Shāng Bù Huàn and Làng Wū Yáo. Despite being a monk, Làng Wū Yáo has determined he is a character with evil intentions. His evil self is revealed when he takes the Seven Blasphemous Deaths and becomes its new master.

Voiced by: Aoi Yūki (JP)
One of the weapons sealed within the Sorcerous Sword Index, it was released by Xiē Yīng Luò. Considered one of the most dangerous weapons because of its malevolent sentience. It has the ability to control the wielder and when unsheathed, those who see the sword is drawn to it in madness. The sword also draws blood from any person it cuts or kills, further increasing its power as well as its wielder's.

Voiced by: Kenta Miyake (JP)
A gigantic dragon living within the Wasteland of Spirits. His wing was sliced off by Shāng Bù Huàn when the latter encountered him on his journey to Dong Li. He is said to have killed and devoured his own kind to survive in the wastelands.

Bewitching Melody of The West
Mù Tiān Mìng (睦天命 Mutsu Tenmei, Destiny)

Voiced by: Nao Tōyama (JP)
She is Shāng Bù Huàn's partner in collecting swords across Xī Yōu and the first person to befriend Làng Wū Yáo. Like Wū Yáo, she is a musician who is also talented in the martial arts.

Zhòu Xún Yīn (咒旬瘖, Jū Shūn In, Mantra)

Voiced by: Kikuko Inoue (JP)
Làng Wū Yáo's mother who is blind. She is a former member of the Xī Yōu Imperial Court. Taking pride of her son's singing voice, she brutally trains him in singing and in combat until Wū Yáo fell ill. When Wū Yáo recovers, his pitch changed, sending Xún Yīn into a frenzy that led to her death by falling off a cliff.

Cháo Fēng (嘲風, Chou Fu, Derision)

Voiced by: Rie Kugimiya (JP)
Princess of Xī Yōu. She is cruel in that she has musicians perform for her while being attacked by her soldiers as part of her entertainment. After seeing Làng Wū Yáo's performance, he is made court virtuoso and is declared as her 'songstress' for life. She is enraged when Wū Yáo left to pursue Shāng Bù Huàn and Mù Tiān Mìng and later joining them.

Tiān Gōng Guǐ Jiàng (天工詭匠, Tenkokishou, Heavenly Crafter)

Voiced by: Kentarō Tone (JP)
An accomplice of Shāng Bù Huàn and Mù Tiān Mìng, he is the creator of the Sorcerous Sword Index.

Season 3
Wā̀n Jūn Pò (萬軍破 Ban Gun Ha, Myriad Army Defeats) / Bǎi Jī Chéng Yì (百撃成義 Hyakugeki Seigi, Paragon of a Hundred Battles)

Voiced by: Akio Ōtsuka (JP)
Former comrade of Shāng Bù Huàn. He joined the Order of The Divine Swarm in hopes of overthrowing the current government and establishing a new world order, with Huò Shì Míng Huáng as its ruler. He also works undercover as one of Xī Yōu's highest-ranked officers.

Yì Piāomiǎo (異飄渺 I Hyou Byou, Beyond Indistinct) / Shuǐ Yuè Dāo Lang (水月刀螂 Suigetsu Tōrō, Crescent-Bladed Mantis)

Voiced by: Natsuki Hanae (JP)
A member of the Order of The Divine Swarm. He, along with Wā̀n Jūn Pò, is assigned by Huò Shì Míng Huáng to assist Xíng Hài as part of the alliance between the Order and the Demon Realm.

Guǐ Duó Tiān Gōng (鬼奪天工 Ki Datsu Ten Kou, Ghost Seizing Heavenly Crafter)

Voices by: Yōji Ueda (JP)
A wizard of Xī Yōu, he wishes to open the portal to the Demon Realm to learn and harness its secrets. He is responsible for building a weaponized prosthetic arm for Lóu Zhèn Jiè.

Zhào Jūn Lín (照君臨 Shou Kun Rin, Shining Reign)

Voices by: Aoi Yūki (JP)
Xíng Hài's elder sister. She is a demon sorceress who infiltrated Xī Yōu's royal court 200 years ago and caused its corruption by seducing its first Emperor to be a bloodthirsty tyrant - a trait that has since been passed down to his successors. After she was killed, she transferred her soul into the holy blade that fatally stabbed her, thus becoming the Seven Blasphemous Deaths.

Azibělpher  (阿爾貝盧法 Ajiberufa)

Voices by: Shin-ichiro Miki (JP)
A count in the Demon Realm with powers over time and space. He is said to be extremely cruel and have visited the human realm several times despite the Demon Lord's orders. Later revealed to be Làng Wū Yáo's father.

Bái Lián (白蓮 Byakuren, White Lotus)

Voices by: Takehito Koyasu (JP)
A mysterious man from a foreign realm and the originator of the magic swords (the Shén Huì Mó Xiè) during the War of the Fading Dusk. He is remembered in history as a god, despite being a mortal man.

Others

Narration
 (JP), Huei-Fung Huang (Min-Nan)

 (JP), Huei-Fung Huang (Min-Nan)
Instructor of Shā Wú Shēng.

Character from Thunderbolt Fantasy Gaiden, former friend of Xíng Hài.

Voiced by: Shinnosuke Ogami (JP)
A Seal Guardian from Season 2 who heads Xiān Zhèn Fortress, which houses and protects various magical weapons. Shāng Bù Huàn approached him for assistance in protecting the Sorcerous Sword Index until the fortress came under attack by first Xiē Yīng Luò, and later by Lóu Zhèn Jiè.

Development
In 2014, Urobuchi came across Pili's exhibition booth within a Taiwanese comic convention while he was invited as the convention's special guest. He was greatly impacted by their execution of the art form, prompting him to take home a full set of Pili's puppet show series to share with his associates within the Japanese ACG industry, and was eager to either plan an original story, or license a couple of series with Pili to dub into Japanese. The news of Urobuchi's interest in Taiwanese puppetry quickly made its way to Pili, which had a decent percentage of staff members who were, according to Nitroplus representative, Digitarou, "anime savvy, Urobuchi fans."  Therefore, Pili International were also actively searching for ways to contact Urobuchi. Both parties contacted each other within a day's time frame asking if they wanted to create something fun together; after various discussions from both parties, they decided to create an original story that is, first and foremost, "a straight-forward narrative" easy for first-time puppetry viewers and the anime demographic to process and appreciate. Hence the birth of the Thunderbolt Fantasy Project.

Media

Soundtrack 

The soundtrack was composed by Hiroyuki Sawano and released on August 24, 2016. The music was composed by Hiroyuki Sawano and the lyrics were written by Benjamin & mpi

Television series
Thunderbolt Fantasy was first announced on February 5, 2016. The series was created and written by Nitroplus' Gen Urobuchi, who used a full year to develop the script closely with Pili. The voices were originally performed in Min-Nan Chinese based on the translated Japanese script for the puppetry performance and broadcast in Taiwan. The episodes were then dubbed into Mandarin Chinese and Japanese for their respective regions' broadcast, with the Japanese version licensed to simulcast outside of Asia by Crunchyroll starting July 8, 2016. The opening theme is "Raimei" performed by Takanori Nishikawa (T.M.Revolution). A sequel was announced at the end of the first season's final episode. The second season premiered in October 2018. For the second season, the opening theme and the ending theme are "His/Story" and "Roll The Dice", respectively, both performed by Takanori Nishikawa. The third season premiered on April 3, 2021. It was set to premiere in 2020 but was delayed due to the COVID-19 pandemic. Takanori Nishikawa performed the opening theme song "Judgement" for the third season, and the ending theme is "thunderBOLTfantasy" by mpi.

Season 1 (2016)

Season 2 (2018)

Season 3 (2021)

Season 1 home video release

Japanese
The Japanese version released both DVD and Blu-Ray editions incorporating Traditional Chinese and Japanese subtitles, audio commentaries featuring the Japanese voice casts and Gen Urobuchi, along with an extra soundtrack disc from Hiroyuki Sawano.

Taiwanese

Manga

Thunderbolt Fantasy
Two manga adaptations have been released in Japan, the first one under the same title as the television series, written by Urobuchi and illustrated by Yui Sakuma, which began serialization in Kodansha's Weekly Morning magazine on July 21, 2016. This adaptation is licensed in North America by Seven Seas Entertainment.

Thunderbolt Fantasy: Otome Genyūki
The second manga is a webmanga titled Thunderbolt Fantasy: Otome Genyūki (Eng. Thunderbolt Fantasy: A Maiden's Magical Journey) written by the Thunderbolt Fantasy Project. It is illustrated by Kairi Shimotsuki, creator of Brave 10 and Madness, and presents Dān Fěi's perspective of her journey. Otome Genyūki began serialization under Akita Shoten's Champion Cross web magazine on September 27, 2016. The final chapter was released on February 28, 2017.

Novel
The Thunderbolt Fantasy main website announced on December 28, 2016 that a side novel of the show was currently in progress.

On January 20, 2017, the Nitroplus website revealed the name of the novel to be Thunderbolt Fantasy Gaiden and that it would mainly focus on Lǐn Xuě Yā, Xíng Hài, and Shā Wú Shēng's pasts. It is written by Erika Mitsunori and Shotaro Teshirogi and illustrated by Shinov Mimori and Minamoto Satoshi, and supervised by Gen Urobuchi. The release date was April 7, 2017.

Theatrical films

On March 25, 2017 at AnimeJapan 2017, it was announced that there would be an upcoming special project called  . The special has two parts, akin to an omnibus format.  Adapted from the "Setsumushō-hen" (Shā Wú Shēng Chapter) story from the side novel Thunderbolt Fantasy: Tōriken Kōki Gaiden, part one is a prequel about Shā Wú Shēng's past. Meanwhile, part two features a new story penned by Urobuchi starring Shāng Bù Huàn. This story takes place between season 1 and season 2. While Nitroplus did not indicate what format the special would take form at the time (e.g. TV, film, web series, etc.), the release date for the special was originally set as November 2017. However, Thunderbolt Fantasy Project later revealed the special would be aired as a theatrical motion picture film on December 2, 2017 in eight Japanese cinemas, and December 8, 2017 in Taiwan. The film was released on a physical disc on April 4, 2018.

The second movie, Thunderbolt Fantasy: Seiyū Genka (Thunderbolt Fantasy: Western Ballad), known in English as Thunderbolt Fantasy – Bewitching Melody of the West was released on October 25, 2019 in both Japan and Taiwan and on December 24 on Crunchyroll. The film is an origin story of the Làng Wū Yáo character from childhood to first joining the travels of Shāng Bù Huàn and takes place entirely before the first season. It also introduces the new character of Mù Tiān Mìng a female musician, sword fighter and companion of Shāng Bù Huàn. The film ends with a brief epilogue by Lǐn Xuě Yā teasing that the fate of Mù Tiān Mìng and why she was not with Shāng Bù Huàn when he arrived in Dōng Li would be explained in season 3.

Notes

References

External links
 
 

Akita Shoten manga
Aniplex franchises
AT-X (TV network) original programming
Films scored by Hiroyuki Sawano
Glove puppetry
Japanese television shows featuring puppetry
Kodansha manga
Nitroplus
Seinen manga
Seven Seas Entertainment titles
Square Enix franchises
Taiwanese television shows featuring puppetry
Television productions suspended due to the COVID-19 pandemic
Japanese fantasy films